William Frederick Hinman  (1 July 1892 – 15 June 1964) was an Australian rules footballer who played in Tasmania and with University in the Victorian Football League (VFL) during the 1910s.

Bill Hinman was born in Launceston, the youngest of four children born to Arthur Hinman and Lucy Maud Gurr and the younger brother of Arthur Hinman. He was educated at Launceston Church Grammar School. Hinman played with North Launceston in the Northern Tasmanian Football Association (NTFA) and was voted club champion for the 1910 season. He then moved to Victoria to pursue his law studies and played with University in the Victorian Football League (VFL).

He had a distinguished military career in World War I, and was awarded the Military Cross in December 1916 for displaying "energy and initiative in reconnoitering enemy positions and obtaining information" during the Battle of Pozières. He was also awarded the Croix de Guerre and the Order of Leopold from Belgium.

In August 1918 he married Jean Agnes Gibson, a fellow Tasmanian who was working as a nurse, in London. They returned to Australia after the war and he became a lawyer in Hobart after the war was over, being admitted to the bar in 1920. He served as president of the Hobart Chamber of Commerce and remained an active sportsman, regularly competing in local golf tournaments. He died in 1964, survived by his wife and children.

References

External links 

Australian rules footballers from Launceston, Tasmania
North Launceston Football Club players
University Football Club players
University of Melbourne alumni
Australian military personnel of World War I
1892 births
1964 deaths

Recipients of the Croix de guerre (Belgium)
Australian recipients of the Military Cross
Military personnel from Tasmania